Büyük Deniz Gölü or Lake Big Peshevit (English: Big Sea Lake), is a glacial lake in Yusufeli district of Artvin Province in Turkey.

Description 
Also, it is the largest lake in terms of surface area in the Kaçkar Mountains with 95500 m² (23 acres).. There is one walking route to the lake from Yaylalar village of Yusufeli. It takes between 5 and 6 hours to reach to the Büyük Deniz Gölü.

References 
  

Lakes of Turkey
Geography of Artvin Province
Yusufeli District